World Rugby Women's 15s Dream Team of the Year was first presented in 2021 by World Rugby. They were voted by a panel of international past players and coaches, World Rugby Hall of Fame inductees and rugby media. The 2021 panel were Liza Burgess (WAL), Lynne Cantwell (IRE), Fiona Coghlan (IRE), Stephen Jones (The Sunday Times, WAL), Gaëlle Mignot (FRA), Jillion Potter (USA), Melodie Robinson (NZL), Karl Te Nana (NZL), and Danielle Waterman (ENG).

In 2021, Canada, Italy, New Zealand and Wales each had one player in the selection; France had six players and England had five. There was a total of 539 caps across the Dream Team.

Dream Team of the Year

References

External links 

 World Rugby Awards

World Rugby Awards